Jeffrey Conrad Stewart (born 1950 in Chicago) is an American Professor of Black Studies at the University of California, Santa Barbara. 
He won the 2018 National Book Award for Nonfiction and the 2019 Pulitzer Prize in Biography for his book The New Negro: The Life of Alain Locke, described as "a panoramic view of the personal trials and artistic triumphs of the father of the Harlem Renaissance and the movement he inspired".

Career

Stewart founded Jeffrey's Jazz Coffeehouse in 2015. He coordinates jazz performances in Isla Vista, the local community adjacent to UC Santa Barbara's campus, in conjunction with his History of Jazz course. In 2019 UC Santa Barbara alumni declared him an honorary alumnus as they recognized his achievements, notably his comprehensive biography of Alain Locke.

Stewart has been 
Visiting Senior Lecturer at the Terra Foundation's affiliate in Giverny, France;
Residential Fellow at the Charles Warren Center in American History, (Harvard);
Fellow at the W. E. B. Du Bois Institute (Harvard);
curator of exhibition To Color America: Portraits by Winold Reiss at the Smithsonian's National Portrait Gallery;
curator Paul Robeson: Artist and Citizen at Rutgers University;
and curator of conference entitled North Hall 50 Years After: A Black Vision of Change at UC Santa Barbara for the weekend of October 12–14, 2018.

Selected publications
, which was a finalist for the 2018 Museum of African American History Stone Book Award. 
, winner of the 2017 Alfred H. Barr Award of the College Art Association.

References

Further reading
 Jeffrey C. Stewart, 1001 Things Everyone Should Know About African American History, Three Rivers Press; 59668th edition (May 4, 1998)   
 Jeffrey C. Stewart, Paul Robeson: Artist and Citizen, Rutgers University Press   
 Jeffrey C. Stewart and Alaine Locke, Race Contacts and Interracial Relations: Lectures on the Theory and Practice of Race, Howard University Press   
 Zack, Michele, Altadena: Between Wilderness and City. Altadena, California: Altadena Historical Society, 2004.

External links

1950 births
20th-century African-American people
21st-century African-American writers
21st-century American biographers
Academics from Illinois
African-American academics
African-American non-fiction writers
Black studies scholars
Living people
National Book Award winners
People from Altadena, California
Pulitzer Prize for Biography or Autobiography winners
University of California, Santa Barbara faculty
University of California, Santa Cruz alumni
Writers from Chicago
Yale University alumni